Brody Mihocek (born 4 February 1993) is an Australian rules footballer who plays for the Collingwood Football Club in the Australian Football League (AFL). He was selected at pick #22 in the 2018 rookie draft. He made his senior debut against Fremantle in round 11 of the 2018 season, kicking 4 goals.

Before arriving in the AFL Mihocek played for the Burnie Dockers Football Club and the Port Melbourne Football Club.

Early life
Mihocek played for Tasmania in the 2011 AFL Under 18 Championships, in which Tasmania were the Division 2 premiers, and was selected in the 2011 Under 18 All-Australian team at centre half-back. However he was overlooked in the 2011 AFL draft. He then played for the Burnie Dockers, and was part of their 2012 Tasmanian State League (TSL) flag, kicking a goal in the Grand Final. After this he decided to move to Melbourne and started playing with Maribyrnong Park in the Essendon District Football League (EDFL) for the 2013 season, in the hopes of securing a place in the Victorian Football League (VFL). This was successful and prior to the 2014 season he was offered a spot on the list of the VFL side Werribee.

VFL career

2014–2015
In 2014, Mihocek signed with Victorian Football League (VFL) club Werribee for 2 seasons after looking to move on from the EDFL. He won the Player's Player award in 2014, playing in the Werribee Development side. In 2015 Mihocek was in and out of the senior team, but played in Werribee's elimination final loss to Collingwood, and was one of Werribee's best. He was also selected to play in the 2015 AFL Victoria Young Gun's game. When Werribee became aligned with AFL side North Melbourne at the end of the 2015 season however, Mihocek sought a move to another club.

2016–2017
Mihocek met with Port Melbourne coach Gary Ayres in the offseason, and crossed over to Port Melbourne for the 2016 season searching for team success. Mihocek played 33 games for Port Melbourne over 2 seasons and kicking 15 goals. He had an impressive first season and was awarded the Jack McFarlane medal for the club's best and fairest in 2016. Mihocek's 2017 season was interrupted by injury, but he returned in the second half of the season and played a key role Port Melbourne's 2017 VFL Premiership. Mihocek primarily played in defence and excelled in the role, but he was also very capable when asked to play up forward. He was looked at by several AFL clubs at the end of the 2016 season as a rookie draft selection, but it wasn't until the conclusion of the 2017 season that AFL side Collingwood contacted Mihocek and informed him that he would be selected by the club in the rookie draft, and he was ultimately the selected with pick #22 as a key defender.

AFL career
Mihocek primarily plays as a tall marking centre half-forward in the AFL, but can move into defence to play on a key forward, or play behind the ball to be an intercept player if needed to. At the forefront of Mihocek's gameplay is a strong mark allowing him to play both ends as a tall, as well as an accurate kick. Additionally, he is also capable of floating up onto a half-forward flank or wing and play a link-up role to send the ball forward. However the most notable facet of his game is his work ethic and selflessness, which is what sets him apart as he's constantly running, applying pressure and leading in the forward half to present as a target.

2018
Collingwood had been watching Mihocek closely in the Victorian Football League (VFL), and chose him as pick 22 in the 2018 rookie draft. While he played primarily as a defender in the VFL, he made his debut as a tall forward against Fremantle in round 11 of the 2018 season to immediate effect, kicking 4 goals, the only player, along with Ryan Nyhuis to kick 4 goals on debut in AFL/VFL history. He found himself a regular in Collingwood's best 22, playing every remaining game in the season, including the finals series and the Grand Final loss against West Coast where he kicked 1 goal. He finished the season with 29 goals from 16 games.

2019
Off the back of an impressive debut season, Mihocek was a walk-up starter for Collingwood, arguably the most important person in their forward line with his marking prowess, running and work-ethic great assets. As Collingwood struggled with injuries and suspensions to a host of their forwards, Mihocek's importance to Collingwood was underlined, as he played every game for the season and led Collingwood's goalkicking with 36 goals, including 5 bags of 4 goals. However his 2019 season would end on a sour note, just like Collingwood's, as he was completely shut out of the game in a wet scrap, only collecting 2 disposals in their loss to Greater Western Sydney. He also received 4 Brownlow Medal votes in 2019.

2020
The reigning leading goalkicker for Collingwood, Mihocek started 2020 in top form, and was leading the Coleman Medal during round 6 with 12 goals. However, after this Mihocek struggled with inconsistent form, as did the Magpies, and only managed 8 goals from the remaining 10 games he played in the home and away season. This poor showing was compounded after a sickening collision with Melbourne's Aaron vandenBerg in the first quarter of their round 12 match left Mihocek knocked out cold. This resulted in him missing round 13, the first time he had missed a game since his debut, putting an end to a run of 52 consecutive games. Mihocek returned to form in the first week of the 2020 Finals series with a 3 goal performance, and was Collingwood's best player in the tense final quarter, getting on top of defender Jeremy McGovern to kick 2 crucial goals, and at the end of the match moving behind the ball, cutting off West Coast inside 50's to help get Collingwood over the line. Mihocek ended the season with 25 goals from 18 games, leading Collingwood's goalkicking for the second consecutive year.

2021
Despite kicking 34 goals and being Collingwood's leading goalkicker for a third straight year, Mihocek, along with Collingwood struggled in 2021, as the Magpies fell from a semi-final berth in 2020 to 17th on the ladder in 2021. Due to this collective drop in form, Mihocek's supply was not to the quality that it was in previous seasons, making it harder to be effective and impact games as a tall forward. Often playing as Collingwood's primary tall forward, the lack of support added to Mihocek's and the Pies woes. However, the  biggest issue was Mihocek's goalkicking. Kicking 34.34 for the year with an accuracy of just 42.5% prevented Mihocek from regularly impacting games, and prevented him from being in any contention for the Coleman medal. Despite these issues however, Mihocek had a career best game against the Gold Coast Suns in round 7 picking up 24 disposals including 20 kicks, collecting 12 marks, and kicking 4.2 in a loss. Unfortunately his season ended on a sour note after he was suspended for 1 game in round 22 for a bump on Brisbane player Tom Fullarton, the first suspension in his career, and only the second time he has missed a game.

2022
Mihocek started the 2022 season strongly, picking up three bags of 4 goals in the first 13 rounds, though missing the round 5 match with COVID-19. This strong form coincided with  a resurgent Collingwood outfit who put a shocking 2021 season behind them to entrench themselves in the top 8. Mihocek's form peaked against reigning premiers Melbourne in round 13, where he clunked 10 marks and bagged 4 goals to drive a massive upset victory. The second half of the season saw Mihocek struggle with niggling problems and a hip injury he picked up after a contest with Mason Redman in round 19 that caused him to miss the following week. Unfortunately his form tapered off after his return as Collingwood surged into a preliminary final, though his presence up forward to crash packs and assist teammates was still valuable. Mihocek finished the season with 41 goals, his best return, and led the Pies' goal kicking for a fourth consecutive year.

Statistics
Updated to the end of the 2022 season.

|-
| 2018 ||  || 41
| 16 || 29 || 18 || 127 || 58 || 185 || 79 || 33 || 1.8 || 1.1 || 7.9 || 3.6 || 11.6 || 4.9 || 2.1 || 0
|-
| 2019 ||  || 41
| 24 || 36 || 26 || 213 || 102 || 315 || 141 || 49 || 1.5 || 1.1 || 8.9 || 4.2 || 13.1 || 5.9 || 2.0 || 4
|-
| 2020 ||  || 41
| 18 || 25 || 9 || 110 || 48 || 158 || 68 || 33 || 1.4 || 0.5 || 6.1 || 2.7 || 8.8 || 3.8 || 1.8 || 5
|-
| 2021 ||  || 41
| 21 || 34 || 34 || 178 || 50 || 228 || 123 || 35 || 1.6 || 1.6 || 8.5 || 2.4 || 10.9 || 5.9 || 1.7 || 0
|-
| 2022 ||  || 41
| 23 || 41 || 25 || 150 || 65 || 215 || 87 || 46 || 1.8 || 1.1 || 6.5 || 2.8 || 9.3 || 3.8 || 2.0 || 3
|- class="sortbottom"
! colspan=3| Career
! 102 !! 165 !! 112 !! 778 !! 323 !! 1101 !! 498 !! 196 !! 1.6 !! 1.1 !! 7.6 !! 3.2 !! 10.8 !! 4.9 !! 1.9 !! 12
|}

Notes

Honours and achievements
Individual
 4× Collingwood Leading Goalkicker Award: 2019 (36), 2020 (25), 2021 (34), 2022 (41)

References

External links

Brody Mihocek from AFL Tables

Collingwood Football Club players
Australian rules footballers from Tasmania
Australian people of Croatian descent
Port Melbourne Football Club players
1993 births
Living people
Werribee Football Club players
Burnie Dockers Football Club players